Charles Tayot (born 20 January 1971) is a former Gabonese sprinter who competed in the men's 100m competition at the 1992 Summer Olympics. He recorded a DNF, having not finished due to injury. His personal best is 10.20, set in 1992. In 1996, he ran for the Gabonese 4 × 100 m team, where they timed at 39.97 in their first heat.

References

1971 births
Living people
Gabonese male sprinters
Athletes (track and field) at the 1992 Summer Olympics
Athletes (track and field) at the 1996 Summer Olympics
Olympic athletes of Gabon
21st-century Gabonese people